The discography of American drag performer and singer Adore Delano consists of three studio albums, one extended play, thirteen singles, one promotional single, and eleven music videos (including one as a featured artist).

Studio albums

Extended plays

Singles

As lead artist

Promotional singles

As featured artist

Music videos

References

Discographies of American artists